DnaJ homolog subfamily B member 2 is a protein that in humans is encoded by the DNAJB2 gene.

References

Further reading

Heat shock proteins